is a Japanese manga series written by Nanki Satō and illustrated by Akira Kiduki. It was serialized in Hakusensha's seinen manga magazine Young Animal from November 2016 to April 2018, with its chapters collected in four tankōbon volumes.

Publication
Written by Nanki Satō and illustrated by Akira Kiduki, Boku wa Ikemen was serialized in Hakusensha's seinen manga magazine Young Animal from November 25, 2016, to April 27, 2018. Hakusensha collected its chapters in four tankōbon volumes, released from June 29, 2017, to June 29, 2018.

Volume list

See also
Sex Nanka Kyōminai, another manga series by the same authors
Usotsuki Paradox, another manga series by the same authors

References

External links
 

Hakusensha manga
Romantic comedy anime and manga
Seinen manga